Amrum Frisian, or Öömrang, is the dialect of the North Frisian language spoken on the island of Amrum in the German region of North Frisia.  Öömrang refers to the Öömrang Frisian name of Amrum, Oomram. Together with the Fering, Söl'ring, and Heligolandic dialects, it forms part of the insular group of North Frisian dialects, and it is very similar to Fering.  Öömrang is spoken by about one third of Amrum's 2300 people.

Characteristics
Differentiation between long and short vowels by doubling of the vowel letter (e.g., lun [land, country] and skuul [school])
Use of numerous diphthongs and one triphthong, "uai" (e.g. spuai [to tell fortunes])
Frequent use of umlauts
Final "w" is pronounced like a short "u" (e.g. leew [dear, sweet])
The "r" is rolled (as in Italian)

Personal and family names
Personal names on Amrum are still today greatly influenced by a Frisian element. Notably, hypocorisms and names with two elements are common. Early borrowings were made from the Danish language and the Christianisation of the North Frisians around 1000 A.D. brought a modest influence of Christian and biblical names. In the Age of Sail, Dutch and West Frisian forms became popular.

Family names were usually patronymic, i.e. they were individually created as genitives from the father's given name. Contrary to the Scandinavian Petersen or Petersson, meaning "Peter's son", an Öömrang name like Peters means "of Peter". This practice was eventually prohibited by the Danish Crown in 1828.

Usage
Lars von Karstedt has illustrated the ominous situation of Öömrang today. The usage of Öömrang is now restricted in home domain. It has lost its function in public communication to German and is only spoken in the households with elderly native speakers of Öömrang. One of the biggest driving forces of the language shift is the change of economic structure brought by the tourism industry. The tourists from across Germany crowded into the small island of Amrum and have quickly taken up the limited housing. Consequently, the rent rapidly increased, driving a lot of the local youngsters out to live in major cities in mainland Germany. Both the influx of English-speaking or German-speaking tourists and tourism employees and the loss of young native speakers are causing drastic decline of the dialect.

References

Amrum
North Frisian language